Masc was a South Korean boy band formed by J Planet Entertainment in 2016. They debuted as a four-member group with Woosoo, 26, ACE and Heejae on August 19th, 2016 with the mini album Strange. In late July 2018, members ACE and Chibin left the group due to assault allegations against the former. Soon after, member 26 left the group to focus on a career in film.

On October 18 2020, the group announced their disbandment through a YouTube video.

Former members
 Woosoo
 Heejae
 Ireah
 Moonbong
 26
 ACE
 Doeun
 Chibin

Discography

Extended plays

Singles

References

K-pop music groups
South Korean boy bands
Musical groups established in 2016
Musical groups from Seoul
2016 establishments in South Korea
South Korean pop music groups
Musical groups disestablished in 2020
2020 disestablishments in South Korea
Peak Time contestants